NY Dosas is a food cart located in Washington Square Park, New York City, in the state of New York. NY Dosas is owned by Thiru Kumar who is from Jaffna, Sri Lanka.

Fare
NY Dosas is a food cart located at Washington Square Park, New York. NY Dosas sells dosas, a Sri Lankan Tamil crepe made of rice and lentils. Dosas are served with coconut chutney and sambar, it also comes with various veggie options. NY Dosas is ranked 16th as one of top twenty best food carts in New York by New York Magazine.

References

Further reading
 Malinsky, Gili. "Kumar's Lunch of Dreams". Mashable.

Food trucks
Street culture
Tamil-American culture